Jenneria pustulata, common name the Jenner's cowry or pustulated cowry, is a species of small sea snail, a marine gastropod mollusk in the family Ovulidae, one of the families of cowry allies.

Description
The shells of this common species reach on average  in length. The shape is usual spindle-like or oval. The dorsum surface is decorated with numerous brilliant orange-red bumps or pustules (hence the Latin name pustulata) surrounded by a dark ring. The basic color of the dorsal surface is  grey, beige or brown. The fine labial teeth are prominent, their color is white or pale brown, and they cross the entire base, with dark brown spaces in between. In the living animals the mantle is greyish, with long tree-shaped sensorial papillae.

Distribution
This species occurs in California, the Gulf of California in Western Mexico, Nicaragua, West Panama, Ecuador, Peru Costa Rica and the Galapagos.

Habitat
These sea snails live in tropical to temperate waters at low tide to subtidal levels, and are usually found on coral reef or rocks. They feed by night  on stony corals (mainly Pocillopora species in the order Scleractinia), and rest during the day.

Importance

This snail have been demonstrated to have significant effects on coral mortality on some Pacific reefs. High predation by this corallivore gastropod was observed in July 2011 at a reef in the northern Gulf of California. Porites panamensis corals were infested by 15 to 40 sea snails per colony. This sea snail is nocturnally active and hides during the day (Glynn, 1985), but during the immersions, individuals were always on the top of the coral colonies, moving and feeding at midday, as Paz-García and colleagues were found. These observations indicates a change in the daily pattern of movement and feeding of this snail in the reef. Despite high density of J. pustulata on the reef, no soft corals were observed as damaged by the sea snail, but only stony corals were infested.

References

 Lorenz F. & Fehse D. (2009). The Living Ovulidae - A manual of the families of Allied Cowries: Ovulidae, Pediculariidae and Eocypraeidae. Conchbooks, Hackenheim, Germany

External links
 Biolib
 

Pediculariinae
Gastropods described in 1786